Per stirpes ("by roots" or "by stock") is a legal term from Latin used in the law of inheritance and estates. An estate of a decedent is distributed per stirpes if each  branch of the family is to receive an equal share of an estate. When the heir in the first generation of a branch predeceased the decedent, the share that would have been given to the heir would be distributed among the heir's issue in equal shares. It may also be known as strict per stirpes or the old English approach, and differs from distribution per capita, as members of the same generation may inherit different amounts.  In section 33 of the Wills Act 1837 in England and Wales, it is called according to their stock.

Examples

Example 1A: The testator A, specifies in his will that his estate is to be divided among his descendants in equal shares per stirpes. A has three children, B, C, and D. B is already dead, but has left two children (grandchildren of A), B1 and B2. When As will is executed, under a distribution per stirpes, C and D each receive one-third of the estate, and B1 and B2 each receive one-sixth. B1 and B2 constitute one "branch" of the family, and collectively receive a share equal to the shares received by C and D as branches (figure 1).

Example 1B: If grandchild B1 had predeceased A, leaving two children B1a and B1b, and grandchild B2 had also died leaving three children B2a, B2b, and B2c, then distribution per stirpes would give one-third each to C and D; one-twelfth each to B1a and B1b, who would constitute a branch; and one-eighteenth each to B2a, B2b, and B2c. Thus, the B, C, and D branches receive equal shares of the whole estate, the B1 and B2 branches receive equal shares of the B branch's share, B1a and B1b receive equal shares of the B1 branch's share, and B2a, B2b, and B2c receive equal shares of the B2 branch's share.

Per capita at each generation

Per capita at each generation is an alternative way of distribution, where heirs of the same generation will each receive the same amount. The estate is divided into equal shares at the generation closest to the deceased with surviving heirs. The number of shares is equal to the number of original members either surviving or with surviving descendants. Each surviving heir of that generation gets a share. The remainder is then equally divided among the next-generation descendants of the deceased descendants in the same manner.

Example 2A: In the first example, children C and D survive, so the estate is divided at their generation. There were three children, so each surviving child receives one-third. The remainder - Bs share - is then divided in the same manner among Bs surviving descendants. The result is the same as under per stirpes because Bs one-third is distributed to B1 and B2 (one-sixth to each).

Example 2B: The per capita and per stirpes results would differ if D also pre-deceased with one child, D1 (figure 2). Under per stirpes, B1 and B2 would each receive one-sixth (half of Bs one-third share), and D1 would receive one-third (all of Ds one-third share). Under per capita, the two-thirds remaining after C 's one-third share was taken would be divided equally among all three children of B and D. (Two-thirds = six-ninths) Each would receive two-ninths:  B1, B2, and D1 would all receive two-ninths.

Notes:
To give the effect indicated in these examples the clause should also include a provision that no beneficiary being a grandchild or remoter descendant will take a share if his or her parent is alive and takes a share.
The spouses of the children (that is, spouses of B, C, and D) are not considered. Spouses are not a part of the branch. Therefore, even if B, C, or, D died leaving a spouse as well as children, all (100%) of the assets pass to the children and (0%) nothing passes to the spouses of As children B, C, and D. From the example above, if As child B died before As death, As grandchildren B1 and B2 would each receive half of Bs share. Even if B had a living spouse at the time of As death, that person would receive nothing from As estate.

Per capita with representation
In many U.S. states, such as New York, a statute has modified the per stirpes approach and utilizes instead a per capita with representation approach (also known as modern American per stirpes). Under the per capita with representation approach, the number of branches is determined by reference to the generation nearest the testator which has a surviving descendant. Thus, in the first example, if C and D also are already dead, and each left one child, named (respectively and appropriately) C1 and D1, then each of B1, B2, C1 and D1 would receive one quarter of the estate. This method is also utilized in the states of Alaska, Arizona, California, Colorado, Hawaii, Maine, Michigan, New Jersey, New Mexico, Ohio, Oklahoma, Pennsylvania, Utah, and West Virginia.

See also 
 Stirps

References

External links
 California Probate Code 245-247

Property law
Latin legal terminology
Inheritance